Jonathan Torohia (born 22 February 1985) is a Tahitian footballer who plays as a goalkeeper for Manu-Ura and the Tahiti national football team.

Career

International
Torohia made his senior international debut on 3 September 2007 in a 1-0 World Cup qualifying victory over the Cook Islands.

Beach
Torohia also competes with the Tahitian national beach soccer team. After impressing at the 2013 FIFA Beach Soccer World Cup, Torohia joined Barcelona for the 2013 Mundialito de Clubes. At the 2015 edition of the Beach Soccer World Cup, Torohia was named best goalkeeper as Tahiti finished runners-up.

In October 2013 he was appointed a knight of the Order of Tahiti Nui.

Career statistics

International

References

External links
Jonathan Torohia at BeachSoccer.com
Jonathan Torohia at Eurosport

1985 births
Living people
French Polynesian footballers
Tahitian beach soccer players
Beach soccer goalkeepers
Tahiti international footballers
Association football goalkeepers
Recipients of the Order of Tahiti Nui